George Allan (1736–1800) was an English antiquary and attorney at Darlington.

Life
Allan spent much of his youth in Wakefield, West Yorkshire, where he was educated at Queen Elizabeth Grammar School, Wakefield. He became an assiduous collector of manuscripts.

Works
He was the author of several works relating to the history and antiquities of  County Durham; he greatly aided William Hutchinson in his History and Antiquities of the County Palatine of Durham. He presented to the Society of Antiquaries of London 26 quarto volumes of a manuscript relating principally to the University of Oxford, which he extracted from the public libraries there. He possessed a printing press, with which he produced several works; among them was a reprint of Robert Hegg's 1626 work, Legend of St Cuthbert.

Family
Allan married Anne Nicholson, and they had six children.

Notes

References

Attribution:

1736 births
1800 deaths
18th-century English historians
English antiquarians
English cartographers
English printers
History of County Durham
People educated at Queen Elizabeth Grammar School, Wakefield
People from Wakefield
Writers from Darlington